A black legend is a style of constructed historical narrative that demonizes a specific nation or person.

Black Legend may also refer to:
 Black legend (Spain), a black legend created about the Spanish Empire
 Black Legend (music group), a UK group of musicians
 Black Legend (company), a defunct video game publisher
 Black Legend of the Spanish Inquisition
 Pope Pius XII and the Holocaust

See also
 Black (disambiguation)
 Black Hand (disambiguation)
 Black leg (disambiguation)
 Legend (disambiguation)